Peștera (meaning "the cave" in Romanian) is a commune in Constanța County, Northern Dobruja, Romania. It includes five villages:
Peștera
Ivrinezu Mare
Ivrinezu Mic
Izvoru Mare (historical name: Mamut-Cuius)
Veteranu (historical name: Idris-Cuius)

Demographics
At the 2011 census, Pestera had 3,178 Romanians (99.28%), 18 Turks (0.56%), 4 Tatars (0.12%), 1 others (0.03%).

References

Communes in Constanța County
Localities in Northern Dobruja